Cumont may refer to:

Cumont (commune), a commune in southern France
Lamothe-Cumont, another commune in Southern France, neighbouring Cumont 
Franz Cumont, a Belgian archaeologist, historian, and philologist 
Charles Cumont, a Belgian pentathlete